Sian Eirian Rees Davies (born 1981) is a Welsh writer.

Rees Davies was born in Bangor in 1981. She grew up on a Pen Llŷn farm before moving to Morfa Nefyn Primary School and High School, and finally College at Pwllheli. She then studied at Bangor University, gaining a degree in Welsh and Creative Writing and a Masters in Arts. She used to teach Welsh at Yale College, Wrexham, before she went back to Pwllheli.

In 2005, she attended the National Eisteddfod of Wales at the Snowdonia National Park and won the Daniel Owen Memorial Prize. Two years later, she took up work as the first manager of Kate Roberts' former house, the Cae'r Gors Heritage Centre. Her works include I Fyd Sy Well (To A Better World, 2005), Nain! Nain! Nain! (Grandma! Grandma! Grandma! 2012), Nerth Bôn Braich (Strength of the Arm, 2008), and Cysgodion Y Coed (Wood Shadows, 2007).

References

Living people
1981 births